John Frankel may refer to:

John Tatum (wrestler) (John Frankel III), American professional wrestler
John Frankel (financier), British venture capitalist